Chiara Calderone (born 10 February 1999) is an Italian ice dancer. With her former skating partner, Pietro Papetti, she is the 2019 Egna Dance Trophy silver medalist and 2018 Open d'Andorra bronze medalist. Earlier in their career, Calderone/Papetti won the Italian national junior title and placed 13th at the 2018 World Junior Championships.

Programs

Ice dancing with Papetti

Ladies' singles

Competitive highlights 
CS: Challenger Series; JGP: Junior Grand Prix

With Riva

Ice dancing with Papetti

Ladies' singles

References

External links 
 

1999 births
Italian female ice dancers
Living people
Figure skaters from Milan
Competitors at the 2019 Winter Universiade
20th-century Italian women
21st-century Italian women